Oxyanthus okuensis is a species of plant in the family Rubiaceae. It is endemic to Cameroon.  Its natural habitat is subtropical or tropical dry forests. It is threatened by habitat loss.

References

Sources

Flora of Cameroon
okuensis
Critically endangered plants
Taxonomy articles created by Polbot
Taxa named by Martin Cheek